The Lerner symmetry theorem is a result used in international trade theory, which states that an ad valorem  import tariff (a percentage of value or an amount per unit) will have the same effects as an export tax. The theorem is based on the observation that the effect on relative prices is the same regardless of which policy (ad valorem tariffs or export taxes) is applied.

The theorem was developed by economist Abba P. Lerner in 1936.

Notes

References

Economics theorems